Troubletown was a syndicated weekly comic strip by American cartoonist Lloyd Dangle. Begun in 1988, it ran in many  alternative weeklies including The Stranger, The Portland Mercury, and The Austin Chronicle. It also appeared in The Progressive magazine. Most strips involved political satire from a liberal perspective.

Several book collections of Troubletown have been published. It is also featured in the anthology Attitude: The New Subversive Cartoonists.

Dangle retired his Troubletown strip at the end of April 2011.

External links
 Troubletown website

References

American comic strips
1988 comics debuts
Gag-a-day comics